Osvaldo Javier Bosso Torres (born 14 October 1993) is a Chilean footballer that currently plays for Audax Italiano in the Primera División de Chile.

External links
 

1993 births
Living people
Footballers from Santiago
Chilean footballers
Segunda División Profesional de Chile players
Chilean Primera División players
Audax Italiano footballers
Association football defenders